Edward Stephen Hall (born 15 January 1988) is an English former strongman. 

He won the World's Strongest Man 2017 competition. Hall has also won national competitions such as UK's Strongest Man, Britain's Strongest Man and England's Strongest Man multiple times.

Early life 
Edward Stephen Hall was born in Newcastle-under-Lyme on 15 January 1988. As a teenager, he was a successful competitive swimmer. He attended Clayton Hall Academy, but was expelled at the age of 15. Soon afterwards, he began homeschooling. In 2008, he began working as a car mechanic in Market Drayton. He competed as a bodybuilder and entered the strongman circuit, having done a strongman competition at the Iceman gym in Stoke-on-Trent.

Career

Strongman
In 2010, Dave Meer of Tamworth had to drop out of the England championships organised by Elite Strongman because of injury. He arranged for Hall to take his place, which led to Hall making it into the 2010 finals and winning on his first attempt by half a point.

Hall finished first at the UK's Strongest Man 2011 competition in Belfast, with Ken Nowicki in second and Rich Smith in third. His win was helped by setting a new national record in the "Viking Hold", hanging on to 20 kg (44lbs) axes in each hand at full stretch for one minute and 18 seconds. Hall tore tendons in an arm during the competition, but was hopeful of a spot at the World's Strongest Man in September. However, his improved ranking could only guarantee a spot for 2012, and he did not compete at WSM in 2011. Winning the UK title meant that Hall became the first choice to replace Jono MacFarlane of New Zealand in the Giants Live Melbourne event in February 2012, when the latter suffered a back injury. He placed fourth in his first taste of international competition. Later, in April 2012, he was invited to compete at Europe's Strongest Man, another Giants Live event. This was held at Headingley Carnegie Stadium, home of the Leeds Rhinos rugby league team and Hall found himself competing alongside six of the ten finalists from World's Strongest Man 2011, including two-time World's Strongest Man, Žydrūnas Savickas. Hall finished in eighth place.

In 2012, Hall competed at the World's Strongest Man competition, but did not progress beyond his qualifying group. In April 2013, Hall failed to qualify for Europe's Strongest Man 2013. However, he was given a second chance when Ervin Katona was forced to retire due to injury. Hall competed in his place and came in eighth place. In April, Hall also featured on BBC One's Watchdog programme, who enlisted his help to test even the strongest of drivers in specific circumstances. Hall competed at the 2013 World's Strongest Man competition later that year, winning two events in his heat but narrowly missing out on qualifying for the final.

In 2014, Hall reached the final for the first time, coming second in the Squat Lift event and ultimately finishing sixth.

In April 2015, he finished fourth at the World's Strongest Man, an improvement of two places on the previous year. In December 2015, a feature documentary about Hall, titled Eddie: Strongman, was released. The film, directed by Matt Bell and produced by Tom Swanston, follows Hall for two years as he strives to become the strongest man in the world.

In March 2016, he achieved a new world record for the Elephant Bar deadlift in the Arnold Strongman Classic, by lifting . The 500 kg lift made Hall bleed from his ears and nostrils, and made him blind before he fainted to the floor.

Hall is the winner of the 2017 World's Strongest Man competition  and announced his intention to retire from the World's Strongest Man and return to lower-weight competitions after expressing health-related concerns. In 2018, Hall appeared on the Channel 5 show Celebs In Solitary, where he attempted to spend five days in solitary confinement. In 2019, Hall presented the SPORTbible webseries Beasted! where he, along with Luke Fullbrook and Chris Peil, helped guide eight men through exercise plans and diets to improve their fitness.

Boxing
Hall started his professional boxing career in 2020 when his rival Hafþór Júlíus Björnsson challenged him after breaking the world record for the deadlift. He confidently responded "I'm going to train the hardest, eat the hardest, sleep the hardest and recover the hardest" amidst having boxed before and with his swimming background, claiming superior levels of cardio and endurance. He incorporated a lot of explosive punches, punching boxing machines and many athletes including gymnast Nile Wilson, pop star Peter Andre and his training partners as hard as he can. Hall's extensive training regime also incorporated a lot of bench presses, squats, deadlifts, medicine ball slams and burpees.

On 19 March 2022, Hall faced Björnsson in Dubai, in a titan weight class boxing match which was tag-lined the heaviest match in history. Hall took the better of the first couple of rounds and managed to put Björnsson down while knocking him against the ropes at the beginning of the second round. But Björnsson bludgeoned Hall and knocked him down twice to the floor in rounds three and six. Hall sustained bleeding lacerations on top of both eyes and lost by unanimous decision with all three judges scoring the bout 57–54 in favour of Björnsson. Hall's boxing stance during the fight (especially from the fourth round onwards) garnered a lot of attention because of its uniqueness, having kept distinctly leaning over to the right side mimicking the natural movement of a Fiddler Crab, trying to negate the reach and height advantage of Björnsson.

On 20 April 2022, Hall got a tattoo on his foot stating "World’s Strongest Man - Hafthor Julius Bjornsson" to commemorate the fight and his loss.

Personal life
Hall is married to Alexandra, a barbershop owner in Trent Vale, with whom he has a son named Maximus. Hall also has a daughter named Layla from a previous partner.

Personal records
Competitions:
 Deadlift (standard bar with figure 8 straps and multi-ply suit) –  (2016 World Deadlift championships/ Europe's Strongest Man) (former world record)
 Rogue Elephant Bar Deadlift (with figure 8 straps and without suit) –  (2016 Arnold Strongman Classic) (former world record)

Professional boxing record

Filmography

Film

Television

Notes

References

External links 
 
 

1988 births
Living people
British strength athletes
English strength athletes
People with Myostatin-related muscle hypertrophy
Sportspeople from Newcastle-under-Lyme
Sportspeople from Stoke-on-Trent